William C. Bradley (June 16, 1941 – June 5, 2002) was an American basketball player. He attended Central High School in Louisville, Kentucky.

A 5'11" (1.80 m) guard, he played for the Kentucky Colonels in the ABA for 58 games during the 1967–68 season.

References

External links

1941 births
2002 deaths
Amateur Athletic Union men's basketball players
American men's basketball players
Basketball players from Louisville, Kentucky
Central High School (Louisville, Kentucky) alumni
Kentucky Colonels players
Shooting guards
Tennessee State Tigers basketball players